The U.S. Department of State's Country Report on Human Rights Practices for São Tomé and Príncipe states that the government generally respects the human rights of its citizens, despite problems in a few areas.

São Tomé and Príncipe is one of 11 sub-Saharan African countries rated "free" in the 2006 Freedom in the World survey published annually by Freedom House, a pro-democracy organization that monitors political rights, civil liberties, and press freedom around the world. On a scale from 1 (most free) to 7 (least free), São Tomé received a 2 for both political rights and civil liberties.

Political rights
From independence in 1975 until 1990, the country was a one-party state with restricted political rights. In 1990, citizens approved a constitution that established a multiparty democracy.

Since then, nine national elections in São Tomé and Príncipe have taken place: four elections for president (in 1991, 1996, 2001, and 2006) and five for the National Assembly (1991, 1994, 1998, 2002, and 2006). All of these elections were conducted to be generally free, fair, and transparent by domestic and international monitors.

Elections at the local level were conducted for the first time in 1992. Príncipe was granted autonomy in 1994 and elected a regional assembly and government in 1995.

Civil liberties
Freedoms of assembly, association, movement, and religion are constitutionally guaranteed and generally respected by the government. Academic freedom is respected.

Press freedom
According to the U.S. State Department, "The law provides for freedom of speech and of the press, and the government generally respected these rights. It also notes that some journalists practice self-censorship."

Television and radio are state operated and there are no independent stations, due to economic and market constraints. There is no law prohibiting the establishment of such stations and all opposition parties have access to the state-run media, including a minimum of three minutes per month on television. Opposition newsletters and pamphlets criticizing the government circulate freely.

São Tomé's press is rated as 'free' by the Freedom House organization. In its 2006 Press Freedom Survey, São Tomé ranked 5th out of Sub-Saharan Africa's 48 countries in terms of press freedom – trailing only Mali, Mauritius, Ghana, and South Africa. 

Freedom House describes the country's press freedom situation as follows: "The Constitution of São Tomé guarantees freedom of the press and the government has an exemplary history of respecting these rights in practice. Publications that criticize official policies circulate freely without journalists being arrested, jailed, tortured or harassed. However, journalists do practice a good degree of self-censorship, and often depend on official news releases for their reports which inhibits the growth of investigative journalism. Lack of advertising revenue, technology, media training and poor salaries also constitute major handicaps for journalists."

Other prominent press freedom organizations such as Reporters Without Borders (RSF), International Press Institute (IPI), and the Committee to Protect Journalists (CPJ) don't include São Tomé in their annual reports.

Rule of law

Judiciary and judicial process
An independent judiciary, including a Supreme Court with members designated by, and responsible to, the National Assembly, was established by the 1990 referendum on multiparty rule. The Supreme Court has ruled against both the government and the president, but is occasionally subject to manipulation. The court system is overburdened, understaffed, inadequately funded, and plagued by long delays in hearing cases.

The law provides for the right to a fair public trial, the right of appeal, the right to legal representation, and, if indigent, the right to an attorney appointed by the state. Defendants are presumed innocent, have the right to confront witnesses, and to present evidence on their own behalf. However, inadequate resources resulted in lengthy pretrial detentions and greatly hindered investigations in criminal cases.

Conduct of security forces
There were no reports that the government or its agents committed arbitrary or unlawful killings, torture, or politically motivated disappearances.

Prison conditions
Prison conditions in the country are described as "harsh, but not life-threatening" in the state department's report. Facilities are reportedly overcrowded, and food was inadequate. Some pretrial prisoners were held with convicted prisoners.

The government permits human rights monitors to visit prisons.

Capital punishment 
Capital punishment in São Tomé and Príncipe was abolished in 1990. São Tomé and Príncipe ratified the Second Optional Protocol to the International Covenant on Civil and Political Rights on January 10, 2017.

Corruption
Official corruption is a serious problem. São Tomé and Príncipe was not surveyed in Transparency International's 2005 Corruption Perceptions Index.

Societal discrimination
The law provides for the equality of all citizens regardless of sex, race, racial origin, political tendency, creed, or philosophic conviction, and while the government actively enforced these provisions, women faced discrimination. Domestic violence against women occurred, including rape, but the extent of the problem was unknown. Although women have the right to legal recourse-–including against spouses–-many were reluctant to bring legal action or were ignorant of their rights under the law. Tradition inhibited women from taking domestic disputes outside the family.

The law stipulates that women and men have equal political, economic, and social rights. While many women have access to opportunities in education, business, and government, in practice women still encountered significant societal discrimination.

Mistreatment of children was not widespread; however, there were few protections for orphans and abandoned children. Child labor was a problem.

There were no reports that persons were trafficked to, from, or within the country.

Worker rights
The rights to organize, strike, and bargain collectively are guaranteed and respected. Few unions exist, but independent cooperatives have taken advantage of the government land-distribution program to attract workers. Because of its role as the main employer in the wage sector, the government remains the key interlocutor for labor on all matters, including wages. Working conditions on many of the state-owned cocoa plantations are harsh.

Historical situation
The following chart shows São Tomé and Príncipe's ratings since 1975 in the Freedom in the World reports, published annually by Freedom House. A rating of 1 is "free"; 7, "not free".

International treaties
São Tomé and Príncipe's stances on international human rights treaties are as follows:

See also 

LGBT rights in São Tomé and Príncipe
Human rights in Africa

Notes 
1.Note that the "Year" signifies the "Year covered". Therefore, the information for the year marked 2008 is from the report published in 2009, and so on.
2.As of Independence on 12 July 1975, and 1 January for years thereafter.
3.The 1982 report covers the year 1981 and the first half of 1982, and the following 1984 report covers the second half of 1982 and the whole of 1983. In the interest of simplicity, these two aberrant "year and a half" reports have been split into three year-long reports through interpolation.

References

External links
2005 Human Rights Report on São Tomé and Príncipe - US Department of State
Freedom of expression in São Tomé and Príncipe - IFEX
Freedom in the World 2011 Report , by Freedom House

 
Sao Tome and Principe
Law of São Tomé and Príncipe
Society of São Tomé and Príncipe